In the 1830s a pidgin trade language based on Haida, known as Haida Jargon, was used in the islands by speakers of English, Haida, Coast Tsimshian, and Heiltsuk.

See also
 Nootka Jargon
 Chinook Jargon
 Medny Aleut language

References

Jargon
North America Native-based pidgins and creoles
Indigenous languages of the Pacific Northwest Coast
Northern Northwest Coast Sprachbund (North America)
First Nations languages in Canada